Artem Kozlov (born 12 August 1992) is a Ukrainian football midfielder.

Career
Kozlov is a product of FC Kremin Kremenchuk youth sportive school and spent time playing for FC Vorskla Poltava in the Ukrainian Premier League Reserves. In March 2012 he signed a contract with FC Olimpia Bălți.

He played for Helios Kharkiv in the Ukrainian First League.

References

External links
 
 
 

1992 births
Living people
People from Kremenchuk
Ukrainian footballers
Association football midfielders
Ukrainian expatriate footballers
CSF Bălți players
Expatriate footballers in Moldova
FC Kremin Kremenchuk players
FC Helios Kharkiv players
FC Inhulets Petrove players
FC Hirnyk-Sport Horishni Plavni players
FC Bukovyna Chernivtsi players
Ukraine youth international footballers
Ukrainian expatriate sportspeople in Moldova
Ukrainian First League players
Ukrainian Second League players
Sportspeople from Poltava Oblast
21st-century Ukrainian people